On 1 March 1143 the Battle of Montiel was fought between Muño Alfonso and an army of knights from Ávila, Segovia, and Toledo on one side and a force of Almoravids on the other. The Christians were accompanied by priests. It was a decisive victory for Muño. 

Early in 1143 Muño set out with a hand-picked troop of 900 knights and 1,000 infantrymen of the local militias to raid the area around Córdoba. On his return through the Muradal Pass he caught sight of a pursuing Almoravid army, also composed of cavalry and infantry. Just past the castle of Calatrava on the road to Toledo, at Montiel in La Mancha, Muño turned to face the Muslims. The Anales toledanos primeros locate the battle on the rio que dicen Adoro (river called Adoro), which may be either the Azuer near Montiel or the Algodor near Mora. 

The emirs of Seville and Granada were both killed, as well as several other Almoravid commanders. A large booty that included gold, silver, precious garments, livestock, weapons, and prisoners was taken. After the battle the victorious army returned to Toledo with the infantry carrying the booty. The heads of the two emirs and the other commanders were impaled on spears and marched about the city as trophies. Muño then ordered them hung from the towers, but Empress Berenguela had them taken down and given to some Jewish and Muslim physicians to be anointed with myrrh and aloes and sent to Córdoba, to their widows.

References
Primary sources
Enrique Flórez, ed. 1767. "Anales toledanos I". España Sagrada, XXIII. Madrid, 381–400. 
Glenn Edward Lipskey, ed. 1972. The Chronicle of Alfonso the Emperor: A Translation of the Chronica Adefonsi imperatoris. PhD dissertation, Northwestern University. 

Secondary sources
Simon Barton. 1997. The Aristocracy in Twelfth-Century León and Castile. Cambridge: Cambridge University Press. 
James F. Powers. 1987. A Society Organized for War: The Iberian Municipal Militias in the Central Middle Ages, 1000–1284. Berkeley: University of California Press.

Notes

Montiel
Montiel
Montiel 1143
1143 in Europe
12th century in Castile
Montiel
12th century in Al-Andalus
History of the province of Ciudad Real